Edge Hill is a historic plantation house located near Woodford in Caroline County, Virginia, United States. It was built in two sections. The earliest dates from 1820 to 1821 and enlarged about 1840 by adding the western half, giving it a formal, symmetrical five-bay facade.  It is a two-story brick dwelling with a gable roof and Federal exterior and interior detailing.

Also on the property is a large wooden building sheathed in board-and-batten siding and covered by a shallow hipped roof.  It was built in 1857, as the Edge Hill Academy, a boys' school operated by the owner of Edge Hill.

It was listed on the National Register of Historic Places in 1983.

References

Plantation houses in Virginia
Houses on the National Register of Historic Places in Virginia
Federal architecture in Virginia
Houses completed in 1840
Houses in Caroline County, Virginia
National Register of Historic Places in Caroline County, Virginia